Mess Me Up may refer to:

 "Mess Me Up", a 2018 song by Naaz from Bits of Naaz
 "Mess Me Up", a 2017 single by Gary Allan
 "Mess Me Up", a 2020 song by Neon Trees from I Can Feel You Forgetting Me